Bredbury Green & Romiley is an electoral ward in the Metropolitan Borough of Stockport.

Together with  Bredbury & Woodley, Hazel Grove, Marple North, Marple South and Offerton it constitutes the Hazel Grove parliamentary constituency. The ward contains both Werneth School and Harrytown Catholic High School.

Councillors 
Bredbury Green and Romiley electoral ward is represented in Westminster by William Wragg MP for Hazel Grove.

The ward is represented on Stockport Council by three councillors:

 Angie Clark (Lib Dem)
 Mark Roberts (Lib Dem)
 Lisa Smart (Lib Dem)

 indicates seat up for re-election.
 indicates councillor defected.

Elections in 2010s

May 2019

May 2018

May 2016

May 2015

May 2014 
Mags Kirkham left the Lib Dems in April 2016 to become an Independent politician.

May 2012

May 2011

References

External links
Stockport Metropolitan Borough Council

Wards of the Metropolitan Borough of Stockport